One World Direct, formerly One World Distribution, is a U.S. company that provides outsourced fulfillment, call center and e-commerce services to other companies. As such, it is typically categorized as a third-party fulfillment company or call center. One World’s operation is headquartered in Mobridge, South Dakota with distribution centers in Mobridge, Mira Loma, California and Columbus, Ohio, and contact centers in Mobridge and Rapid City, South Dakota. The company’s sales offices are located in Pasadena, California.

History
One World Distribution was founded in 1994 by Thomas E. Unterseher and Heather K.A. Bohr. The couple moved from Pasadena to Mobridge to start the company and take advantage of South Dakota’s lower operating cost environment.

In 1999, One World was named a “Top Ten Growing with Technology” award winner by Inc. Magazine and Cisco Systems.

By the end of 2003, the company had more than 30 employees. By 2006, One World had 60 employees; that year Unterseher and Bohr and their children moved back to Pasadena but kept their Mobridge residence and oversight of the company, visiting frequently. 

The company changed its name to One World Direct in 2009.

Clients and services
One World’s clients range from large Fortune 500 companies such as Sony to small dot com operations. The company serves clients who sell their products through e-commerce and direct-to-consumer channels. In addition to order fulfillment, call center and e-commerce integration, One World provides returns processing, warehousing, inventory management and credit card processing.

References

Call centre companies
Business process outsourcing companies